Lucy Cane CBE (c.1866 – 23 April 1926) was an Irish public servant.

Life
Lucy Cane was born Mary O'Brien around 1866, probably in Cahirmoyle, County Limerick. She was the third and youngest child of Edward William and his wife, Mary Spring O'Brien. Her elder siblings were Dermod and Nelly. Her paternal grandfather was William Smith O'Brien, and a maternal cousin was Mary Spring Rice. O'Brien was educated at home. Following the death of her mother from tuberculosis, the three siblings were raised by their aunt, Charlotte Grace O'Brien.

In 1894, she married a childhood friend of her brother, barrister and administrator Arthur Beresford Cane, CBE (died 1939). The couple had two daughters. O'Brien joined the Voluntary Aid Detachment of the British Red Cross, serving at the headquarters from 1914 to 1917 under Katharine Furse. She eventually moved to England and became the VAD assistant director, and retired in 1919 with a CBE. She died in London on 23 April 1926.

Some of her correspondence is held along with that of her family in the National Library of Ireland. Katharine Furse's husband, Charles Wellington Furse painted a portrait of Cane.

References

1866 births
1926 deaths
People from County Limerick in health professions
Commanders of the Order of the British Empire